Charkhari is a constituency of the Uttar Pradesh Legislative Assembly covering the entire sub-district of Kulpahar and part of sub-district Charkhari in the Mahoba district of Uttar Pradesh, India. It is mainly a rural constituency having  small urban centers of Kulpahar, Charkhari, Panwari, Jaitpur and Kharela.

Charkhari is one of five assembly constituencies in the Hamirpur (Uttar Pradesh Lok Sabha constituency). Since 2008, this assembly constituency is numbered 231 amongst 403 constituencies.

Members of the Legislative Assembly
1962: Mohan Lal Ahirwar, Indian National Congress
1967: J. Singh, Independent
1969: Chandra Narain Singh, Bharatiya Jana Sangh
1974: Kashi Prasad, Bharatiya Kranti Dal
1977: Mohan Lal, Indian National Congress
1980: Mohan Lal, Indian National Congress (Indira)
1985: Mihi Lal, Indian National Congress
1989: Kashi Prasad, Janata Dal
1991: Mihi Lal, Indian National Congress
1993: Udai Prakash, Bahujan Samaj Party
1996: Chhotey Lal, Bharatiya Janata Party
2002: Ambesh Kumari, Samajwadi Party
2007: Anil Kumar Ahirwar, Bahujan Samaj Party
2012: Uma Bharti, Bharatiya Janata Party
2014: Kaptan Singh, Samajwadi Party
2015: Urmila Rajput, Samajwadi Party
2017: Brijbhushan Rajpoot, Bharatiya Janata Party
2022: Brijbhushan Rajpoot, Bharatiya Janata Party

Election results

2022
Bharatiya Janta Party candidate Brijbhusan Rajpoot alias Guddu Bhaiya won in  2022 Uttar Pradesh Legislative Elections defeating Samajwadi Party candidate Ramjeevan by a margin of 41,881 votes.

References

External links
 Official Site of Legislature in Uttar Pradesh
Uttar Pradesh Government website
UP Assembly
 

Assembly constituencies of Uttar Pradesh
Mahoba district